Skrīveri Station is a railway station on the Riga – Daugavpils Railway, Latvia.

References 

Railway stations in Latvia
Railway stations opened in 1861
Aizkraukle Municipality
Vidzeme